The 1982–83 Toronto Maple Leafs season was the 66th season of the franchise, 56th season as the Maple Leafs.

Offseason

NHL Draft

Regular season

Final standings

Schedule and results

Player statistics

Regular season
Scoring

Goaltending

Playoffs
Scoring

Goaltending

Playoffs
Despite rocky standings, the Leafs managed to make the playoffs. However, they lost in the preliminary round to the Minnesota North Stars.

Preliminary Round: (N2) Minnesota North Stars vs. (N3) Toronto Maple Leafs

Transactions
The Maple Leafs were involved in the following transactions during the 1982-83 season.

Trades

Free agents

Awards and honors

References
 Maple Leafs on Hockey Database

Toronto Maple Leafs seasons
Toronto Maple Leafs season, 1982-83
Toronto